Philip Albright (died 21 July 1959), was an American actor and writer who worked for a number of years in Australia. He came to Australia in 1949 to appear in Dream Girl on stage and decided to stay, becoming a writer at the ABC, on radio and TV. He was one of the key radio writers for Ron Roberts Productions.

He wrote some of the first TV dramas in Australia. He died in 1959 and his play The Break was produced after his death.

Select Credits
Dream Girl - actor
His Excellency (1958) - TV play - writer
Sorry, Wrong Number (1958) - TV play - writer
Lady in Danger (1959) - TV play - writer
The Skin of Our Teeth (1959) - TV play - writer
Dinner with the Family (1959) - TV play - writer
The Strong Are Lonely (1959) - TV play - writer
The Bust (1959) - play - writer
The Break (1962) - play - writer

References

External links
Philip Albright at Ausstage

American screenwriters
1959 deaths
20th-century American screenwriters